Operation Chesterfield was the assault by the 1st Canadian Division on the Hitler Line, on May 23-24 1944 during World War II. The Hitler Line was a German fortified defensive line south of Rome.

Initial attempts to penetrate the defenses before they had been effectively manned had failed and a set piece, prepared assault became necessary. The action was hard-fought and the Germans launched repeated counterattacks over the two days, attempting to retake their former positions. Ultimately, Allied forces penetrated the Hitler line and the German defenders had to retreat, in some disorder.  A corresponding same-day American breakout at the Anzio beachhead further weakened the German situation in Italy.

References

Italian campaign (World War II)
Land battles of World War II involving the United Kingdom
Military operations of World War II involving Germany
Battles of World War II involving Canada
Military history of Canada during World War II
May 1944 events